is a former Japanese football player.

Playing career
Katagiri was born in Gifu on August 1, 1983. After graduating from high school, he joined J1 League club Nagoya Grampus Eight in 2002. Although he debuted in first season, he could hardly play in the match. In 2004, he was loaned to Argentine club Rosario Central and Quilmes. Although he returned to Grampus in 2005, he could not play at all in the match. In July 2005, he moved to Japan Football League (JFL) club FC Horikoshi and played many matches. In 2006, he moved to his local club FC Gifu in Regional Leagues. He became a regular player and scored many goals. FC Gifu was promoted to JFL in 2007 and J2 League in 2008. In June 2009, he moved to J2 club Ventforet Kofu. He played many matches as substitute forward in 2009 and became a regular forward in 2010. Although he could hardly play in the match in late 2010, Ventforet was promoted to J1 end of 2010 season. Although he played many matches in 2011, Ventforet was relegated to J2 in a year. He could not play many matches in 2012 and left the club end of 2012 season. After half year blank, he joined JFL club MIO Biwako Shiga in August 2013. He retired end of 2013 season.

Club statistics

References

External links

1983 births
Living people
Association football people from Gifu Prefecture
Japanese footballers
J1 League players
J2 League players
Japan Football League players
Nagoya Grampus players
Rosario Central footballers
Quilmes Atlético Club footballers
Arte Takasaki players
FC Gifu players
Ventforet Kofu players
MIO Biwako Shiga players
Expatriate footballers in Argentina
Association football forwards